Nathan John Feuerstein (born March 30, 1991), known by his initials NF (stylized as ИF), is an American rapper, singer, songwriter, and record producer. He has released two EPs, I'm Free (2012), and a self-titled EP in 2014 with Capitol CMG. His first major-label album, Mansion, was released on March 31, 2015. His second studio album, Therapy Session, was released on April 22, 2016, and peaked at number 12 on the US Billboard 200.  His albums have earned several accolades, some of which include: the Gospel Music Association Dove Award for Rap/Hip Hop Album of the Year (Therapy Session).

NF achieved mainstream popularity in 2017 with Perception; the album charted at number one in the United States and was certified platinum, while its third single, "Let You Down", reached number twelve on the U.S. Billboard Hot 100, and was a top-ten hit internationally. He achieved similar commercial success with his follow up The Search (2019).

Early life 

Nathan John Feuerstein was born in Gladwin, Michigan, on March 30, 1991. His parents divorced, and he was raised by his mother until his father had to take him away when her boyfriend abused him. His mother died from an overdose in 2009 which led to him dedicating the song "How Could You Leave Us" to her. He graduated from Gladwin High School in 2009, and was on the school's basketball team. NF started his career at the Fine Arts Festival organized by Connection Church in Canton, Michigan.

Career 

Feuerstein stated that, during his childhood, rap was an escape for him. He would record songs on a karaoke machine, recording instrumentals on one microphone and his raps on the other. On November 29, 2010, Feuerstein independently released his debut studio album Moments under his real name. On August 2, 2011, he released his debut single "Alone". The song featured songwriter and producer Tommee Profitt and Brooke Griffith. In 2012, Feuerstein's work attracted the attention of Xist Music. On May 2, 2012, he released his debut extended play I'm Free with production work from Profitt. The tracklist consisted of nine songs including "Alone". The EP also included an exclusive version of "Alone" featuring Sean Simmonds. Xist teased for the release of the self-titled extended play, NF, but Feuerstein parted ways with the label after a dispute and the production of NF was postponed. Despite this, NF featured a song, "Only One", featuring Shuree Williams, in the label's compilation album, Move Vol 1. He released a single, "Beautiful Addiction", on November 4, 2013. The song again featured an appearance from Profitt, as well as vocals from Brady Schmitz and Danielle Swift.

Feuerstein signed to Capitol Christian Music Group in 2014, before the release of the EP, NF. This project was his breakthrough release on the Billboard, as it charted on the Christian Albums chart at No. 12, on the Top Gospel Albums at No. 4, and on the Top Rap Albums at No. 15. This extended play was reviewed by Jesus Freak Hideout and New Release Tuesday, receiving two three-and-a-half-star reviews. CCM Magazine reviewed the EP and awarded it four stars. His first studio album, Mansion, was released on March 31, 2015, by Capitol CMG.

"Intro", the lead single from Mansion, is included in the video game Madden NFL 16. NF's songs have been played on ESPN, VH1, Showtime, NBC's Chicago P.D., Grimm, Shades of Blue, a trailer for an Apex Legends update and in the season finale trailer of Fox's Empire. His music video for "Intro" premiered on MTV.com's homepage, and the video has also appeared on MTVU, AbsolutePunk, 2DOPEBOYZ, Raps & Hustles and The College Dropouts.

NF's songs "I Just Wanna Know" and "Real" were released on April 8, 2016, and on April 22, 2016, respectively, as singles from his second studio album Therapy Session, released on April 22, 2016. "Warm Up" was released as a non-album single on September 8, 2016.

On October 6, 2017, NF released his third studio album, Perception. The album debuted at No. 1 on the Billboard 200, making it his first chart-topping album and the second artist in 2017 to release a No. 1 album without having charted on the Hot 100. The next week, "Let You Down" became his first single to chart on the Hot 100, debuting at 87. It became a sleeper hit, taking 17 weeks to reach its peak at No. 12. After the success of Perception, he announced he would begin touring mid-2018 with rappers Logic and Kyle. It was certified platinum—selling over 1,000,000 units—by the RIAA on January 11, 2019.

His song "Destiny" is included in the video game MLB The Show 18.

In 2018, NF released the non-album single "No Name" on January 19. Later, he would release the song "WHY", the first single preceding his fourth studio album.

On May 30, 2019, he released the title track of the album, "The Search". He would later release two more singles, "When I Grow Up" on June 27, and "Time" on July 12. The Search was released on July 26.

On December 3, 2019, Feuerstein released the single "Paid My Dues", as well as a music video for the song.

In October 2020, NF returned with the non-album single, "Chasing_(Demo)", after sharing a snippet of it online. The song features 15-year-old Australian fan Mikayla Sippel, who uploaded a cover of it, which inspired NF to officially release the song after being "blown away" by her version.

On February 18, 2021, NF released the single "Clouds", alongside a music video, and announced his mixtape of the same name, which was scheduled for a March 26, 2021, release. The mixtape included "Paid My Dues", as well as guest appearances from rappers Hopsin (Lost/LOST) and Tech N9ne (Trust/TRUST), followed by a third single, "Lost" featuring Hopsin, released on March 11, 2021. On March 26, 2021, Clouds (The Mixtape) was released.

After a year long absence from music, NF released a single "Hope" on February 16, 2023 and also announced his fifth studio album of the same name, which is set to release on April 7, 2023.

Artistry 
Feuerstein has credited Eminem as his prime influence in hip hop, claiming that at one point that was all he listened to. NF's style has also been compared to Logic and Machine Gun Kelly. Although he found his musical upbringing in Christian hip-hop, Feuerstein has denied his label as a Christian rapper, saying "I'm a Christian, but I don't make Christian music. You're not going to reach everyone with just one point of view. I write about things I'm actually dealing with. You don't have to be Christian to relate to them."

In 2013, Feuerstein appeared on Christian hip-hop artist Flame's album Royal Flush on the track "Start Over". In 2015, his features on TobyMac's This Is Not a Test track "Til the Day I Die" and Marty's Marty For President track "The One With My Friends" gained him fame and recognition in the Christian hip-hop genre. Feuerstein's 2017 collaboration with Futuristic, "Epiphany", enhanced his career in the secular rap industry.

Tours 
 Therapy Session Tour (2017)
Perception Tour (2018)
Perception World Tour (2018)
The Search Tour (2019)
Clouds Tour (2021)

Personal life 
Feuerstein began dating Bridgette Doremus in 2015. They married in September 2018 after three years of dating. They have one child, a son, who was born in 2021.

Discography

Studio albums

EPs

Mixtapes

Singles

As lead artist

As featured artist

Other charted or certified songs

Music videos

Awards and nominations

Notes

References 

1991 births
Living people
Rappers from Michigan
People from Gladwin, Michigan
Christians from Michigan
21st-century American rappers
American hip hop singers
Singer-songwriters from Michigan
Record producers from Michigan
American performers of Christian hip hop music
American male rappers